Kepler-371c (also known as KOI-2194.02, K02194.02, KIC 3548044 c) is a confirmed Super-Earth sized exoplanet. Orbiting around the F-type star Kepler-371 every 68 days about 1914 ly away from the Earth. It is a member of the multi planetary system of Kepler-371.

References

371c
c
Super-Earths
Exoplanets discovered in 2014
Transiting exoplanets
Cygnus (constellation)